Raymond Bath (born 4 May 1944) is a South African former cricketer. He played in two first-class matches for Boland in 1980/81.

See also
 List of Boland representative cricketers

References

External links
 

1944 births
Living people
South African cricketers
Boland cricketers
People from Worcester, South Africa
Cricketers from the Western Cape